Kamau Sadiki Leverock (born 19 October 1994) is a Bermudian cricketer and the captain of the Bermuda cricket team. A nephew of two former ODI players, Dwayne Leverock (Bermuda) and Austin Codrington (Canada), Leverock is a left-handed batsman who bowls right-arm fast-medium. He was educated at the Bermuda Institute.

Career
Having played for Bermuda at various age levels, Leverock made his debut for Bermuda against Argentina in the 2011 ICC World Cricket League Americas Region Twenty20 Division One.  He made five further appearances during the tournament.  Later in 2011, he played Second XI cricket in England for Surrey. In 2012, he was selected as part of Bermuda's fourteen man squad for the 2012 World Twenty20 Qualifier in the United Arab Emirates. He made his Twenty20 debut during the tournament against Denmark, with him making eight further appearances during the tournament, the last of which came against Uganda.  In his nine matches, he scored 75 runs at an average of 15.00, with a high score of 21 not out. With the ball, he took 4 wickets at an expensive bowling average of 63.25, with best figures of 2/28. Bermuda finished the tournament in thirteenth place and therefore missed out on qualification for the 2012 World Twenty in Sri Lanka.

While studying at Cardiff Metropolitan University in Wales, Leverock was selected for Cardiff MCC University's squad. He made his first-class debut for the team in April 2015, playing against Gloucestershire in Bristol. The previous year, before playing for Bermuda in the 2014 WCL Division Three tournament in Malaysia, Leverock had played English club cricket for Horsham, a Sussex team.

He made his List A debut for ICC Americas in the 2016–17 Regional Super50 on 26 January 2017.

In April 2018, he was named in Bermuda's squad for the 2018 ICC World Cricket League Division Four tournament in Malaysia. He was named as the player to watch in the squad ahead of the tournament.

On 3 June 2018, he was selected to play for the Vancouver Knights in the players' draft for the inaugural edition of the Global T20 Canada tournament.

In August 2019, he was named in Bermuda's squad for the Regional Finals of the 2018–19 ICC T20 World Cup Americas Qualifier tournament. He made his Twenty20 International (T20I) debut for Bermuda against the United States on 18 August 2019. In September 2019, he was named in Bermuda's squad for the 2019 ICC T20 World Cup Qualifier tournament in the United Arab Emirates. He was the leading wicket-taker for Bermuda in the tournament, with eight dismissals in six matches. In November 2019, he was named in Bermuda's squad for the Cricket World Cup Challenge League B tournament in Oman.

In October 2021, he was named as the captain of Bermuda's squad for the 2021 ICC Men's T20 World Cup Americas Qualifier tournament in Antigua. In May 2022, he was named as the captain of Bermuda's side for the 2022 Uganda Cricket World Cup Challenge League B tournament.

References

External links

1994 births
Living people
Bermudian cricketers
Bermudian expatriate sportspeople in England
Cardiff MCCU cricketers
ICC Americas cricketers
Bermuda Twenty20 International cricketers
Bermudian expatriate sportspeople in Wales